The 2018 NAIA Division II Men’s Basketball national championship was held from March 7-13 at the Sanford Pentagon in Sioux Falls, SD.  The 27th annual NAIA basketball tournament featured thirty-two teams playing in a single-elimination format.   In a rematch of the 2016 Championship game, the outcome was the same.  The championship game was won by the Indiana Wesleyan Wildcats of Marion, Indiana over the Saint Francis Cougars of Fort Wayne, Indiana by a score of 84 to 71.

Bracket

 * denotes game decided in overtime

See also
2018 NAIA Division I men's basketball tournament
2018 NCAA Division I men's basketball tournament
2018 NCAA Division II men's basketball tournament
2018 NCAA Division III men's basketball tournament
2018 NAIA Division II women's basketball tournament

References

NAIA Men's Basketball Championship
2018 in sports in South Dakota
Tournament